Jim Grabb and Patrick McEnroe defeated John Fitzgerald and Anders Järryd in the final, 7–5, 7–6, 5–7, 6–3 to win the doubles tennis title at the 1989 Masters Grand Prix.

Rick Leach and Jim Pugh were the defending champions, but were eliminated in the round-robin stage.

Draw

Finals

Playoffs

Fifth place

Seventh place

Round robin

Red group
Standings are determined by: 1. number of wins; 2. number of matches; 3. in two-players-ties, head-to-head records; 4. in three-players-ties, percentage of sets won, or of games won; 5. steering-committee decision.

Blue group
Standings are determined by: 1. number of wins; 2. number of matches; 3. in two-players-ties, head-to-head records; 4. in three-players-ties, percentage of sets won, or of games won; 5. steering-committee decision.

Doubles